Museum of Chocolate or Chocolate Museum may refer to:

 Museum of cacao and chocolate, Brussels
 Chocolate Museum (New Brunswick), Canada
 Chocolala Chocolate Museum, Tallinn, Estonia
 Musée du chocolat, Fécamp, Normandy, France
 Imhoff-Schokoladenmuseum (Imhoff Chocolate Museum), Cologne, Germany
 Halloren Schokoladenmuseum (Halloren Chocolate Museum), at Halloren Chocolate Factory in Halle, Saxony-Anhalt, Germany
 Museum of Chocolate (Pokrov), Russia
 A museum in Astorga, Spain
 Museu de la Xocolata, El Born, Ciudad Vieja, Spain
 Hungya Chocolate Museum, Taiwan

See also
 Musée "Les secrets du chocolat" in Geispolsheim, France
 List of chocolate museums
 Choco-Story (disambiguation)